Glenard Paul (Glen) Lipscomb (August 19, 1915 – February 1, 1970) was a United States Congressman from the state of California from 1953 to 1970.

Biography 
Born in Jackson County, Michigan, Lipscomb moved to California with his parents in 1920, where the family settled in Los Angeles. He was educated in the Los Angeles public schools, including Belmont High School (Los Angeles, California). After attending the University of Southern California and Woodbury College (now in Burbank), he became an accountant.

He served in the Army's Financial Corps during World War II and in 1947 was elected to the California State Assembly 56th district, where he served until 1953.

Congress 
That year he won a special election to the U.S. House to replace Norris Poulson, representing California's twenty-fourth district. Lipscomb voted in favor of the Civil Rights Acts of 1957 and 1960, as well as the 24th Amendment to the U.S. Constitution and the Voting Rights Act of 1965, but voted against the Civil Rights Acts of 1964 and 1968.

Death 
Lipscomb continued to serve in the House for the remainder of his life. He died of cancer at Bethesda Naval Hospital at the age of 54 on February 1, 1970 and is interred at Forest Lawn Memorial Park Cemetery, Hollywood Hills.  The submarine USS Glenard P. Lipscomb was named after him.

Lipscomb was married to Virginia Sognalian Lipscomb, a classmate at Belmont.

For a short time a BSA camp near Big Bear Lake was named after him: Camp Lipscomb.

See also
 List of United States Congress members who died in office (1950–99)

References

External links
 LIPSCOMB, Glenard Paul, (1915 - 1970)
 
 Join California Glenard P. Lipscomb

1915 births
1970 deaths
Belmont High School (Los Angeles) alumni
University of Southern California alumni
United States Army officers
Deaths from cancer in Maryland
Burials at Forest Lawn Memorial Park (Hollywood Hills)
People from Jackson County, Michigan
Republican Party members of the United States House of Representatives from California
20th-century American politicians
United States Army personnel of World War II
Republican Party members of the California State Assembly
Military personnel from Michigan